The Quiet Man is an action-adventure beat 'em up video game developed by Human Head Studios and published by Square Enix for Microsoft Windows and PlayStation 4. The game's story is told through lengthy full motion video sequences, some of which feature live-action actors, inserted between the gameplay sequences. It features a deaf protagonist, reflected by having most of the events having muted sound with no subtitles.

The Quiet Man was critically panned upon its release, with the complaints stemming from issues with the story, the underdeveloped gameplay sequences, and the lack of commitment displayed towards the deafness gimmick. In response, the audio was restored in a post-release update as an optional feature.

Gameplay
Most of the game consists of full motion videos and extended cutscenes, but players participate most intensely during combat scenarios. Wordless on screen symbols explain how combat can proceed. Players have the option of punching, kicking, and evasion, as well as combination moves. There is also a "focus" mode where players can "beat down" their opponent with a flurry of blows.

Plot
A young and deaf boy named Dane interrupts a quarrel between his friend, Taye, and a bully, Isaac, that results in Dane's mother Lorraine getting shot when Taye and Isaac struggle over a gun. Isaac takes credit for the killing and is arrested while Taye runs away. Dane's policeman father, Robert, blames Dane for his wife's death and becomes abusive toward him. Dane, traumatized by these events, makes up a character in his drawings named "The Quiet Man", who resembles a plague doctor.

Years later, Dane serves as an enforcer for Taye, who runs a nightclub and leads an American Mafia-styled mob. Taye expresses concern about his girlfriend, a singer named Lala (who appears identical to Lorraine), who has been receiving mysterious letters addressed to her by a stalker. When Dane escorts Lala to the nightclub, her performance is interrupted by an ambush from SOL 33, a rival gang led by Isaac. The stalker, who looks like Dane's "Quiet Man" drawing, kidnaps Lala during the confusion. Taye's associate B-Money wants Dane to call Taye about the escalation of the gang war, but Dane prefers to recover Lala on his own. B-Money ignores Dane's advice and calls Taye anyway, inciting the mob boss's anger.

Dane tracks Lala's trail throughout the city, leading him to Isaac's penthouse. There Dane fights Isaac, throwing him out a window, and rescues Lala. While escaping the building they encounter Taye, who angrily believes that Dane is the stalker and tried to trick Taye into a gang war with Isaac out of jealously over Lala. Lala explains to Taye that she faked her own kidnapping, but Taye decides to have them both killed. Robert, now a detective, appears and saves them both.

As Dane and Robert pursue Taye to his office, Taye shoots Robert and tries to explain to Dane that the death of Lorraine was an accident. Taye is interrupted by Lala before he can shoot Dane, and Taye chases her up to the roof. A wounded Robert encourages Dane to put on The Quiet Man mask to save Lala. As The Quiet Man, Dane confronts Taye and fights off his men. After losing a fight with Dane, Taye decides to shoot Lala but Dane takes the bullet for her. Injured, Dane reawakens with supernatural abilities, and kills Taye. Robert appears wearing the Quiet Man mask and reveals he was the stalker, and helped Lala fake her own kidnapping in order to manipulate Dane into killing Isaac and Taye to get revenge for Lorraine. Dane and Robert fight, ending in both of them collapsing from their injuries.

A post-credits scene has Dane being released from prison as a result of his actions, and meeting up with Robert, ready to make amends for the events that have unfolded.

Development and release
The Quiet Man was announced during Square Enix's press conference at E3 2018. To give an insight of the game's concept, a series of planned producer letters by Kensei Fujinaga were posted on the game's Twitter account. The first one dated July 2, 2018 explains the power of "words". On August 9, 2018, Fujinaga hosted a special livestream showcasing the gameplay, story, and cinematics

Man of Action Studios, a group of comic book writers helped create The Quiet Man's story. One of the game's greatest challenges was to make the game have an action feel, but eliminate much of the traditional menus and bars that track battle progress and abilities in most games in order to retain a cinematic feel.

The Quiet Man was released on November 1, 2018, for PlayStation 4 and Microsoft Windows. A downloadable patch for the game named Answered, which provides a second play-through that restores the sounds, dialogue and soundtrack to the game was released a week later, on November 8, 2018.

Reception

The teaser trailer was met with a mixed critical response. Shack News, Press-Start and ComicsBeat found it interesting. Polygon, SegmentNext and Screen Rant labeled it conceptually intriguing. Destructoid named it bizarre. The Ball State Daily News thought that the transition between video game footage and live-action in the trailer didn't go well, as well as criticizing the title for resembling the film The Bye Bye Man.

The Quiet Man received "generally unfavorable reviews" according to review aggregator Metacritic. It was Metacritic's Official Worst Game of 2018, meaning it was the lowest-scoring of 2018. PC Gamer described the game as a "spectacular disaster" and added "there are lots of bad games, but for a game that was announced at E3 and made by a major publisher and studio to be this catastrophic is something." Destructoid gave it a 4 out of 10, stating that the game failed to deliver on its advertisement of "high-production live action, realistic CG and pulse-pounding action gameplay", and though it had some high points, "they soon [gave] way to glaring faults." IGN gave it a 5.5 out of 10, praising the live action cutscenes game for being comparable to a well-made episode of a TV show, though he highly criticized the gameplay for being a lackluster button-masher.

In a video review, critic Jim Sterling called the game "a miserable and exhausting time", saying that the game's story was impossible to understand with the lack of dialogue, further explaining that the then-upcoming Answered update and its New Game Plus with audible dialogue would not adequately fix the problem, as players are still forced to play without dialogue the first time. They also found the combat more difficult than necessary due to a poor camera and distracting cutscenes being overlaid during combat sequences. They later placed The Quiet Man at the top of their worst games of the 2018 list, calling it "an abject, stupid failure" in both gameplay and story, and further lambasting the story by opining that the mere existence of the Answered update proved its execution to be fundamentally flawed and that, in its incomprehensibility, it inadvertently portrayed deaf people as incapable of understanding the world around them.

References

External links

2018 video games
Action-adventure games
Beat 'em ups
Deaf culture
Fictional deaf characters
Full motion video based games
PlayStation 4 games
Square Enix games
Video games developed in the United States
Video games set in New York City
Windows games
Unreal Engine games
Single-player video games
Human Head Studios games